"I'm with Stupid" (released as a single under the name of "I'm with Stupid (He's a Loser)") is the second single from Static-X's debut album, Wisconsin Death Trip. The song starts off with singer Wayne Static screaming out the words of the chorus, "He’s a loser, she said" and quickly moving on to the main guitar riff that is repeated throughout the song. The outro, a sample of dialogue from actress Linnea Quigley, comes from the 1988 film Sorority Babes in the Slimeball Bowl-O-Rama.

Live performances
System of a Down bassist Shavo Odadjian performed rhythm guitar for the song during a performance at Ozzfest 1999.

Music video
The music video for the song shows the band performing on stage, while a woman holding a shovel chases down the strange creature from the "Push It" music video. A couple of monsters and a blue man make appearances. In the end, the shovel lady beats the creature down with her shovel, and reveals herself to actually be Wayne Static. There are seven monkeys hidden in the music video. The director of this video was David Meyers.

Track listing

Charts

References

2000 singles
Static-X songs
1999 songs
Warner Records singles
Songs written by Tony Campos
Songs written by Ken Jay
Songs written by Wayne Static
Songs written by Koichi Fukuda